Rico Meinel (born 3 April 1974) is a retired German ski jumper.

In the World Cup he finished once among the top 10, his best result being a fifth place from Innsbruck in the Four Hills Tournament in January 1995.

External links

1974 births
Living people
German male ski jumpers